The 2017–18 season (officially known as Liga de Plata and also as Torneo Luis Baltazar Ramírez) will be El Salvador's Segunda División de Fútbol Salvadoreño. The season will be split into two championships Apertura 2017 and Clausura 2018. The champions of the Apertura and Clausura play the direct promotion playoff every year. The winner of that series ascends to Primera División de Fútbol de El Salvador.

Changes from the 2017-2018 seasons
Teams promoted to 2017–18 Primera División de Fútbol Profesional season
 Audaz

Teams relegated to Segunda División de Fútbol Salvadoreño  - Apertura 2017
 UES

Teams relegated to Tercera División de Fútbol Profesional - Apertura 2017 
 Leones de Occidente
 C.D. Vendaval

Teams promoted from Tercera Division De Fútbol Profesional - Apertura 2016
  Ilopaneco
 Chagüite
 UDET

New Teams or teams that purchased a spot in the Segunda division
 El Vencedor (Purchased the spot of Luis Angel Firpo B)
 C.D. Vendaval (originally relegated but bought the spot of Marte Soyapango for $12,000)

Teams that failed to register for the Apertura 2017
 UES(Team de-registered due to not filing the right paperwork in time)
 Turin FESA (Team de-registered due to not filing the right paperwork in time) 
 Firpo B (sold their spot to Vencedor)
 Marte Soyapango (sold their spot to Vendaval)

Further Changes 

On January 17, 2018 Once Municipal was stripped of their footballing license due to unpaid fees to Segunda division and lack of payments to players and coaches.

Team information
A total of 22 teams will contest the league, including  sides from the 2016–17 Segunda División and 3 promoted from the Tercera Division. Once Municipal was removed following the apertura season due to failure to pay the Segunda division.

Teams

Managerial changes

Apertura

Final Series

Semifinals 

El Roble won 2-1 on aggregate.

Jocoro won 7-6 on aggregate.

Finals

First leg

Second leg

Jocoro FC won 4-3 on aggregate.

Individual awards

Clausura

Final Series

Round of 16 

Chagüite won 3-2 on aggregate.

2-2 draw on aggregate, Brujos de Izalco won 5-4 on penalties

Topiltzin won 4-2 on aggregate.

3-3 on aggregate. El Vencedor won 2-1 on penalties

Jocoro F.C. won 5-3 on aggregate.

Racing Jnr won 2-1 on aggregate.

Quarterfinals 
The best two loser teams in the round of 16 will advance to the quarter-finals, the teams were Ilopaneco and Independiente.

Brujos de Izalco won 2-1 on aggregate.

Chagüite won 3-2 on aggregate.

3-3, Independiente won 6-5 on penalties.

Jocoro F.C. won 5-0 on aggregate.

Semifinals 

Brujos de Izalco won 3-1 on aggregate.

Jocoro FC won 2-1 on aggregate.

Final

First leg

Second leg

Jocoro won 6-3 on aggregate.

Individual awards

Relegation table 
The three teams that finished last in their respective group would normally be relegated . However, all three teams  will play a series of home and away games and only two will be relegated to the Tercera Division this season. Apopa  finished top and survived relegation. While UDET   and San Rafael Cedros were relegated.

References

External links
 https://archive.today/20130807152309/http://www.futbolsv.com/category/segunda-division/
 http://www.culebritamacheteada.com.sv/category/nacional/segunda-division-nacional/ 
 http://www.edhdeportes.com/futbol-nacional/segunda-division/

Segunda División de Fútbol Salvadoreño seasons
2017–18 in Salvadoran football
EL Sal